Angel Miguel Villalona (born August 13, 1990) is a Dominican Republic professional baseball first baseman. He had been rated by many baseball websites as the San Francisco Giants' No. 1 prospect.

Career
In August 2006, the Giants gave Villalona a club-record $2.1 million signing bonus. In 2007, they assigned him to extended spring training with the idea of sending him to rookie or short-season ball later in the minor league season. He was then assigned to the Arizona Giants of the Rookie-level Arizona League as a 3rd baseman, hitting .264 and with an OPS in excess of .800 through July 30, 2007. Villalona played 2008 with the Augusta GreenJackets of the Class A South Atlantic League, and was named to the 2008 All-Star Futures Game. He played the year with the San Jose Giants of the Class A-Advanced California League.

On November 19, 2011, the Giants added Villalona to their 40-man roster to avoid exposing him to the Rule 5 draft. He was subsequently optioned to San Jose in March 2012 and placed back on the restricted list in April. The Giants reported on February 8, 2013, that Villalona's visa to come to the United States had been approved, and that once he arrived at their spring training camp at Scottsdale, the team would apply to the league for his reinstatement from the restricted list.

Villalona played 44 games for the Dominican Summer League Giants in 2012, batting .303, hitting seven home runs, and driving in 34 runs. In 2013, he played for San Jose, and played in the all-star game. He played for the Richmond Flying Squirrels of the Class AA Eastern League in the 2013 and 2014 seasons. He also played the 2014 season with Richmond. After the 2014 season, the Giants outrighted Villalona off of their 40-man roster. He played the 2015 season with San Jose.

In 2018, Villalona was playing for the Guelph Royals in the Intercounty Baseball League in Ontario, Canada; he played for the team during the 2019 season, as well. The team was eliminated from the playoffs during both seasons.

Personal life
On September 20, 2009, the Dominican Republic police announced that Villalona was a suspect in the murder of Mario Felix de Jesus Velete. He turned himself in, and could have faced up to 20 years in prison if convicted.

In November 2009, Villalona was released on bond but still faced a murder charge. The victim's family asked a judge to drop the case, prompting his release, which appears related to a reported monetary settlement of approximately $139,000 that Villalona reached with the family of Mario Felix de Jesus Velete. He would have stayed in jail awaiting arraignment on the charge without the settlement, but the prosecutor still planned to pursue the case. He appeared in court for a preliminary hearing on April 27, 2010, to determine whether the case would go to trial. He was then free on bond, but his U.S. visa was subsequently revoked.

The charge against him was dropped due to lack of evidence. According to USA Today, the prosecutor said that the "his star witness, a friend who accompanied the deceased person to the bar, disappeared after Villalona paid the victim's family to avoid a civil lawsuit". As well, Villanola had friends who had been at the scene vouching for his innocence. Villalona filed suit against the Giants for breach of contract in a Dominican court in early 2011, but settled the case out of court when the team reinstated him to its farm system. Villalona resumed professional play with the Dominican Summer League in June 2012.

References

External links

Living people
1990 births
Dominican Republic baseball players
People from La Romana, Dominican Republic
Arizona League Giants players
Salem-Keizer Volcanoes players
Augusta GreenJackets players
San Jose Giants players
Richmond Flying Squirrels players
Azucareros del Este players
Dominican Summer League Giants players
Toros del Este players
Scottsdale Scorpions players